Acute Haemmorrhagic Conjunctivitis is the inflammation of the conjunctiva of sudden onset. It presents as a reddening of the eye due to the infection of the conjunctiva. The conjunctiva is the thin transparent tissue that covers the eye from the Corneal limbus to the lid margin. Many conditions can lead to the inflammation of the conjunctiva. They include allergies, bacterial infection, viral infection etc. A common form of the condition that occurs every rainy season is the seasonal conjunctivitis popularly referred to as "Apollo" by West Africans because the reports of its first epidemic in Accra coincided with the Apollo 11 moon landing. Every year prior to the rainy season in the country, various health warnings are given to remind citizens of the condition.

Signs of the disease
Acute Haemmorrhagic Conjunctivitis is normally recognized by the affected individual upon waking. The eyelids stick together requiring great effort in separating them. Intense whitish mucopurulent discharge is observed throughout the day with the eye having a reddish hue. There is pain which is worse upon looking up or at light. Other symptoms include sore eyes, feeling of grittiness or burning, redness, watery discharge, swelling of eyelids.

Infection rate
AHC has a very fast rate of infection. Upon affecting one eye, the condition is known to infect the other eye in a short while (maximum three days). As an infected person goes around his house or work, the conditions spreads. This is because the things that the individual touches normally become sources of infection. As such it is advised that once infected, the individual should keep a high level of hygiene so that the rate of infection can be regulated.

Effect on the Visual system
Once the infection start, there are a lot of effects that the infected individual would have. They include:
Inability to do near work comfortably
Blurry vision due to the discharge
Covering of the eyes with the palm to limit the amount of light entering it
Eye discomfort due to the false feeling of foreign body (sand) on the eye

Prognosis
The forecast of the disease in terms of its resolution is very good. Though self limiting the condition can resolve faster if antibiotics are administered onto the eye. Topical doses of most ophthalmic medication are effective in treating the condition.

Public health issue
AHC is of an annual occurrence which affects hundreds of thousands of people in Ghana every year. Because of the ease of spread - from person to person, it requires prompt treatment. This causes a major health challenge to health workers especially ophthalmologist and optometrist as the large number of cases require various treatments tailored to address the condition. Once an individual is affected, he or she is advised to stay away from crowded areas etc. to limit the person to person infection. The temporal change in activities of the infected individual leads to decrease productivity and visual function. The effect of this has a telling implication on both the infected individual and those around him or her. It is for these reasons that the ministry of health of Ghana considers the education and prompt treatment of those with the condition a vital tool in increased productivity across all field of the national development especially prior to the rainy season.

References

Disorders of conjunctiva
Eye care in Ghana